The discography of Chin Injeti consists of his work with "Bass is Base", his Solo Career and tracks he has written/produced on.

Bass is Base

Singles 

1994 Funkmobile (Soul Shack)
1995 Straw Six & Brix (Soul Shack)
1995 Westside Funk (Soul Shack)
1995 Diamond Dreams (Loose Cannon/A & M)
1996 I Cry (Loose Cannon/A & M)

Albums 

1994 First Impressions For The Bottom Jigglers (Soul Shack)
1995 Memories Of The Soulshack Survivors (Loose Cannon/A & M)

Videos 

1994 Funkmobile
1996 I Cry

Solo career

Daydreaming (2001) 

The Players:

Chin Injeti - Keyboards, bass, electric and acoustic guitars, turntable scratches, drum programming, lead and background vocals.
Jamie Kaufmann - Drums
Murray Atkinson - Guitar
Brad Turner - Keyboards
Russ Kline - Guitar
David Kershaw - Keyboards
"The People Get Ready Choir" - Vocals
Suk Sandu (Coach) - Guitar
Kenny Sam - Tablas (ointatateh)
Moka Only - Vocals
Sahara MacDonald - Vocals
Kaythryn Rose - Vocals

D'tach (2010)

Re'tach EP (2011)

Songwriter/Producer 

 Ridley Bent – Blam! (album) (2005)
 Zaki Ibrahim - Eclectica (Episodes In Purple) (2008)
"You Choose"
"Computer Girl"
"Lost In You"
 
 50 Cent - Before I Self Destruct (2009)
"Could've Been You feat. R Kelly "

 Drake - So Far Gone (2009)
"Fear"

 Clipse - Til the Casket Drops (2009)
"Kinda Like A Big Deal feat. Kanye West"
"There Was A Murder"

 Kinnie Starr - A Different Day (2010)
"High Heels"
"Another's Gone"
"Crow's Perspective"

 Zaki Ibrahim - For Colored Girls (Soundtrack) (2010)
"Ansomnia"

 Eminem - Recovery (2010)
"Talkin' 2 Myself"
"Almost Famous"

 EA Games Fight Night Championship (Co-Produced with DJ Khalil) (2011)
"Running Thru"
"China"
"Live 4 Tomorrow"
"Organ Man"
"Red"

 Defenders of the Faith (2011)
"All Tha Time (ft. Bishop Lamonte)

 50 Cent - "The Big 10" Mixtape (2011)
"Shootin' Guns"

References 

Injeti, Chin